Gascoyne Land Division was a land division of Western Australia defined under the Land Regulations of 2 March 1887. It included almost all of the modern Gascoyne region of the State. In the Land Act 1898, it was renamed Western to avoid confusion with the Gascoyne Land District which had just been created by the Department of Lands and Surveys, and on 1 February 1907, section 26 of the Land Act Amendment Act 1906 merged it into North-West Land Division.

It was defined thus in the Land Regulations in 1887:

References

Land divisions of Western Australia